{{SAFESUBST:#invoke:Unsubst||date= |$B=

}}

"Dual power" was a term first used by communist Bolshevik leader Vladimir Lenin (1870–1924) in the Pravda article titled "The Dual Power" which described a situation in the wake of the February Revolution, the first of two Russian Revolutions in 1917. Two powers coexisted with each other and competed for legitimacy: the Soviets (workers' councils), particularly the Petrograd Soviet, and the continuing official state apparatus of the Russian Provisional Government of the Social Revolutionaries.

Lenin argued that this essentially unstable situation constituted a unique opportunity for the Soviets and Bolsheviks to seize power by smashing the weak Provisional Government and establishing themselves as the basis of a new form of state power.

This notion has informed the strategies of subsequent communist-led revolutions elsewhere in the world, including the Chinese Revolution of 1949 led by Mao Zedong (1893–1976) after the Chinese Civil War (1927–1936 and 1946–1949) and in eastern Europe after World War II (1939–1945).

Background 

After Tsar Nicholas II abdicated the throne, the resulting February Revolution led to the establishment of the Provisional Government and its counterpart, the Petrograd Soviet. The Provisional Government was composed of former State Duma representatives with approval from the Petrograd Soviet, whereas the Petrograd Soviet was made up of socialist leaders elected by a proletariat constituency. With the Russian government moving from an autocracy to this system of "dual power" with the Provisional Government and Petrograd Soviet constantly vying for power, there was much confusion on how both could coexist and govern effectively.

In this confusion, the Provisional Government realized the Soviet had the people's trust and enthusiasm. In the hopes of appeasing the Soviet and keeping the support of the population, the Provisional Government launched several very bold liberal acts and promoted civil liberties through means of freedom of speech, press, and assembly. Yet, other than strategic political motives, the Provisional Government understood that their power was illegitimate, due to the fact that they were not elected by the people. To solve the problem of illegitimacy, the Provisional Government was in the process of establishing the Constituent Assembly, whose members would be democratically elected by the people. The Constituent Assembly would never come to be under the Provisional Government's rule, as the elections were set after the Bolsheviks seized power in the October Revolution.

After the February Revolution, Lenin published his April Theses and in it he expressed unhappiness with the February Revolution as he described it as a "Bourgeois Revolution". He pushed for the slogan "All Power to the Soviets". Lenin mentioned that a Proletarian Revolution was necessary, and expressed that he had no interest in cooperating with the Provisional Government or the other Soviet leaders who were willing to compromise. Other members of Soviet leadership were skeptical of Lenin's ideas since they were afraid that Lenin and the Bolsheviks were advocating for anarchism. Lenin also criticized the Petrograd Soviet for governing alongside the Provisional Government, and accused them of forgetting and abandoning socialist ideas and the proletarian revolution.

Provisional Government 
The Provisional Government's members primarily consisted of former State Duma members under Nicholas II's reign. Its members were mainly members of the Constitutional Democratic Party (known as the Kadet party), as the Kadets were the only formal political party functioning in the Provisional Government at its conception. The ideological and political ideas differed wildly throughout the party's leadership and members, but most were moderates, offering both liberal and conservative views at times.  The Kadets and the Provisional Government alike pushed for new policies including the release of political prisoners, a decree of freedom of press, cessation of the Okhrana, abolition of the death penalty, and rights for minorities. The Provisional Government and the Kadets also wanted Russia to continue to be involved in World War I, much to the dismay of the Soviets. Despite certain political ideas, the Kadets became slightly more conservative overall with the rise of left-wing parties and left-wing thought within both the Provisional Government and the Petrograd Soviet. The Provisional Government realized that their power was not legitimate since they were former Duma members, and not elected by a general public. They knew that to be seen as a legitimate government body, they would need to be elected by the people, and they established the Constituent Assembly and scheduled popular elections to take place later in the year.

Alexander Kerensky, a former member of the Fourth Duma and a chairmen of the Soviet Executive Committee and eventually the Prime Minister for the Provisional Government, was brought into the Provisional Government as a way to gain support from left-wing parties and the Petrograd Soviet. Kerensky was a moderate socialist, and believed that cooperation with the Provisional Government was necessary. Historian S. A. Smith explains that after the appointment of Kerensky "Thus was born 'dual power', an institutional arrangement under which the Provisional Government enjoyed formal authority, but where the Soviet Executive Committee had real power." The Provisional Government feared the Soviets immense growing power, and through this fear they tried to appease them as much as possible. When Kerensky became Prime Minister, he attempted to work with the Soviets including arming the Soviets and their followers during the Kornilov affair. The attempts of Kerensky would not last for a while, as the Bolsheviks did not believe in compromise and overthrew the Provisional Government in the October Revolution.

Petrograd Soviet 
The Soviet of Workers' and Soldiers' Deputies in Petrograd served as the voice of the smaller councils of deputies elected by commoners, specifically soldiers and workers. The Petrograd Soviet, therefore, could claim a much better understanding of the people's will, since it was composed of many orators whom the lower class population elected. The Soviet was established after the February Revolution, composed of numerous socialist revolutionaries.

The workers and soldiers of Russia saw hope in the Petrograd soviets, and elected deputies to it en masse, causing it to gain membership at an alarming rate (1,200 seats had been filled in a week). The Petrograd Soviet was seen as a benefactor that would bring them land, bread, and peace.

The executive committee was initially made up of Nikolai Ckheidze, Matvei Skobelev, and Alexander Kerensky. These men were socialists, but feared radicalism. To keep radical mentality from spreading and provoking a "counter-revolutionary movement", they chose to support the Provisional Government where necessary. This led to the uneasy balance of power called dual power.

July Days' impact 
The events of the July Days would solidify the issues of dual power within government between the Provisional Government and Petrograd Soviet. Between the dates of 3 and 7 July (Julian Calendar date), a Bolshevik uprising, still disputed whether intentional by Lenin, occurred. In what is seen as a "grassroots" uprising, workers and lower ranks of soldiers violently demonstrated in the streets, calling for the Soviet to take power over the Provisional Government. The uprising was supported by the Bolshevik Military Organization and Petersburg Committee, who sent in more support, but the leaders of the party had less concrete opinions about the demonstration.

Alexander Kerensky, head of the Provisional Government, led a crackdown on those involved with the events of the July Days and overthrow of the Provisional Government. The military was used to gather and arrest violent demonstrators, retake government buildings from Bolshevik forces, and dissolve military units that had participated in the attempted overthrow. The Provisional Government also attempted to undermine Lenin and his party by revealing their investigation of his ties to Germany, Russia's enemy during World War I. These combined actions would quell the Bolshevik uprising and support until August 1917 (Julian).

The reinstatement of the death penalty for soldiers, and Kerensky transferring the Provisional Government into the Winter Palace were among the actions that led to accusations of counterrevolutionary activity (reestablishment of autocratic government) by the Provisional Government. A new kind of duality between the classes (proletariat and bourgeoisie) was a split noticeable not only in government, but also in everyday life for Russians. This led to increased tensions between both theaters, and made it difficult for groups to collaborate. The Petrograd Soviet represented the Proletariat, while the Provisional Government members were part of the former State Duma, representing the old government under the tsar. This divide was also evident in the military, between rank-and-file soldiers and military officers. As World War I continued on, soldiers started to mutiny or to disobey orders from their superiors, while supporting the soviets, hoping to bring an end to Russia's involvement in the war.

Bolshevik takeover 
Although the Bolshevik party was largely put down after the events of the July Days, Lenin still believed that the group could gain power in government because of unsteadiness due to the dual power situation. In April he wrote that the time was not yet right for revolution, as the Petrograd Soviet was still involved and working with the Provisional Government, as well as stating, "we do not as yet know a type of government superior to and better than the Soviets." With the July Days seen as "Lenin's worst blunder", even though it was not necessarily his intention, the Bolsheviks were still not in place to take over the Provisional Government and Petrograd Soviet.

However, with the Kornilov affair of August 1917 (Julian-style date), the Bolsheviks regained both power in their party, but also with the masses. With Kornilov's soldiers moving towards the capital of Petrograd (modern day Saint Petersburg) and the Provisional Government, Kerensky had released many Bolshevik leaders arrested during the July Days and also provided arms in order for the Bolsheviks to defend the Provisional Government. By arming and calling on those who he had earlier punished, the Bolsheviks saw that they truly were gaining power in the government and Russian society. The Russian population lost faith in the Provisional Government because of how it handled Kornilov's coup, and many began supporting the Bolsheviks, with the group winning elections throughout Petrograd, especially in districts made up of the working class. This event, coupled with food shortages, the continuation of Russian involvement in World War I, and mass unemployment, worked in the Bolsheviks favor, turning people away from the government in charge and toward the party that promised "Bread, Peace, Land."

When the Bolsheviks overthrew the Provisional Government during the October Revolution, they were able to do so with little resistance. The Provisional Government realized that their power was limited at the point of takeover, as the Bolsheviks had been gaining supporters and had more revolutionaries. When the actual overthrow occurred between the days of October 25 and 26 (Julian), Bolsheviks first seized means of transportation and communication, such as roads, bridges, railways, and post offices. Lenin then went to the Second Congress of Soviets of Workers' and Soldiers' Deputies to present the overthrow of the Provisional Government and state authority by the Bolshevik party. The Winter Palace (at the time, the home of the Provisional Government) was seized without a casualty the morning of the 26th, and the Congress had no choice but to approve Lenin's decree. With this, the period of dual power between the Provisional Government and Petrograd Soviet came to a close.

Strategy and ideological concepts 
As the ideological monopoly of dominant institutions is broken and people increasingly rely on Alternative Institutions (AIs), those who benefited from existing arrangements may seek to dismantle their upstart competitors. At the same time, those who seek fundamental changes in society or who find the alternative ways of organizing it valuable may seek to enlarge and strengthen the alternative infrastructure. Counter institutions (XIs) are created both to defend the AIs and to promote their growth. These work to challenge and attack the status quo while creating, defending, and securing space for opposition and alternative institutions. They do this with everything from political protests, to direct appropriation (of plantations, government buildings, factories, etc.) for the use of alternative institutions, to civil disobedience or armed resistance. The line between AIs and XIs is seldom entirely clear as many alternative institutions are also self-promoting or defending. Together the AIs and XIs form an alternative source of power in society which is "necessarily autonomous from, and competitive with, the dominant system, seeking to encroach upon the latter's domain, and, eventually, to replace it."

Successful dual-power rebellions end with the acceptance of the new social forms by much of the populace and the realization by the old rulers that they are no longer capable of using their systems of force against the revolutionary movement. This can occur because noncooperation has crippled the old structures of power, because too few people remain loyal to the old rulers to enforce their will, or because the rulers themselves undergo an ideological conversion. At this point, there is not general confusion. The disappearance of old leaders and structures of power is accommodated by the expansion of the alternative system. The alleged "necessity" for a revolutionary vanguard to guide the revolutionary impulse is shown to have no basis: because the people have already learned how to govern their own affairs, they need no tutelage from above. The possibility of co-option is minimized: "When the people recognize their true power, it cannot be taken away by rhetoric or ... imposition."

The French Marxist writer and guerilla partisan Régis Debray identified the concept of dual-power with that of the movement of Trotskyism in his popular 1967 work Révolution dans la Révolution? (Revolution in the Revolution?). Within the theory of dual-power, according to Debray, the guerilla movement is subordinated to that of the vanguard party which both inhibits the flexibility of tactics available to revolutionary guerilla armies and places them in a defensive position to protect vanguard party officials and assets. Debray's strategical framework largely identified with that of the Cuban Revolution, in particular that of Fidel Castro and Ernesto "Che" Guevara.

Modern usage by libertarian socialists

Libertarian socialists have more recently appropriated the term to refer to the nonviolent strategy of achieving a libertarian socialist economy and polity by means of incrementally establishing and then networking institutions of direct participatory democracy to contest the existing power structures of state and capitalism. This does not necessarily mean disengagement with existing institutions; for example, Yates McKee describes a dual-power approach as "forging alliances and supporting demands on existing institutions – elected officials, public agencies, universities, workplaces, banks, corporations, museums – while at the same time developing self-organized counter-institutions." In this context, the strategy itself is sometimes also referred to as "counterpower" to differentiate it from the term's Leninist origins.

Strategies used by libertarian socialists to build dual power include:
 Mutualism – building alternative economies through co-operatives, credit unions and local purchasing.
 Municipalism – building popular assemblies to make decisions at the community level.
 Syndicalism – building revolutionary trade unions to confront management in the workplace.

Historical Examples of moments of Dual Power
 The Italian popolo in opposition to the nobles who controlled city states in the late 13th century. "It gradually developed its own officials, who paralleled those of the commune"
 The Spanish Revolt of the Comuneros "had established a parallel or "dual" power in opposition to the prevailing royal administration."

See also 

 Anarcho-syndicalism
 
 Communalism
 Council communism
 Diarchy
 Marxism–Leninism
 Marxism–Leninism–Maoism
 Mass line
 Mutual aid (organization theory)
 New world order (Bahá'í)
 Prefigurative politics
 Rojava conflict
 Tunisian Revolution
 Workers' self-management
 Workplace democracy

References

Footnotes

Bibliography 

 
 
 
 
 
 
 
 
 

Activism
Communist terminology
Marxist theory
Political movements
Political theories
Russian Revolution
Social change